Kolleram is a village and rural commune in the Mirriah Department of the Zinder Region of Niger. 

The village is known for its unusual dependency on cardboard boxes, of which it is used for necessities such as plumbing, shelter, and even clothing, which has come to be known as the Kolleram cardboard phenomenon, a term coined by author Issouf Ag Maha.

References

Communes of Niger
Zinder Region